Zussman is a surname. Notable people with the surname include:

Julianne Zussman (born 1987), Canadian rugby union player
Raymond Zussman (1917–1944), United States Army officer and Medal of Honor recipient
Richard Zussman (born 1983), Canadian television journalist
Shirley Zussman (1914–2021), American sex therapist

Zussman may also refer to:

U.S. Army Lt. Raymond Zussman (FS-246), a United States Army cargo ship of 1944–1950 which later served in the United States Fish and Wildlife Service from 1950 to 1963 as MV Penguin II

See also
Eliezer Zussman-Sofer (1828–1902), Hungarian rabbi

Jewish surnames